The 2022 Metro Atlantic Athletic Conference men's basketball tournament was the postseason men's basketball tournament for the Metro Atlantic Athletic Conference for the 2021–22 NCAA Division I men's basketball season. The tournament was played March 8–12, 2022, at the Jim Whelan Boardwalk Hall in Atlantic City, New Jersey, for the third year in a row. The tournament winner, the Saint Peter's Peacocks, received the conference's automatic bid to the 2022 NCAA Division I men's basketball tournament.

Seeds
All 11 teams in the conference participated in the Tournament. The top five teams received byes to the quarterfinals. Teams were seeded by record within the conference, with a tiebreaker system to seed teams with identical conference records.

Schedule

Bracket

Game summaries

First round

Quarterfinals

Semifinals

Championship

Team and tournament leaders

Team leaders

All-championship team

See also
 2022 MAAC women's basketball tournament

References

Tournament
2022
College basketball tournaments in New Jersey
Sports competitions in Atlantic City, New Jersey
MAAC men's basketball tournament
MAAC men's basketball tournament